Muang Kham is a small town in Xiangkhouang Province in northeastern Laos. The road between Muang Kham and Nong Haet is noted for its Thai Dam funerary shrines with white tombs, prayer flags and offerings.

Healthcare
The Kham District Hospital is located in Muang Kham.

References

Populated places in Xiangkhouang Province